The Pharmacists Council of Nigeria (PCN) is a Federal Government Agency of Nigeria, established by Decree 91 of 1992 (now Act 91 of 1992)—due to transfer of power from military to civilian in 1999—to regulate and control the practice of pharmacy in Nigeria.
Its responsibility is to control and regulate the practice of pharmacy throughout the Federation and the control of pharmaceutical education in Nigeria.

Functions
It determines what standard of knowledge and skill are to be attained by persons seeking to become pharmacists in Nigeria
Establishes and maintains a register of pharmacists and secures the publication from time to time of the list of those names as entered in the register
Issues pharmacists oath and code of ethics
Appoints pharmaceutical inspectors to ensure the enforcement of the provisions of the law by inspection and monitoring of premises where pharmaceutical endeavours take place
Maintains a register of pharmacy technicians

Notable members
Babalola Chinedum Peace
Isa Marte Hussaini
Jimi Agbaje
Ahmed Tijani Mora
Adelusi Adeluyi

References

Medical and health organizations based in Nigeria
Government agencies of Nigeria